Coates v. City of Cincinnati, 402 U.S. 611 (1971), is a United States Supreme Court case in which the Court held that a local city ordinance that made it a criminal offense for three or more persons to assemble on a sidewalk and “annoy” any passersby was unconstitutionally vague. Dennis Coates participated in a protest along with four other unnamed students, all of whom were convicted of violating the city ordinance. Coates appealed to the Ohio Supreme Court, which upheld the conviction. However, this conviction was overturned in the divided United States Supreme Court decision. The Court found that the ordinance was unconstitutionally vague and violated the First Amendment freedom of assembly.

Background 
In 1956 Cincinnati, Ohio passed an ordinance which provided that:

Dennis Coates, a student, and four other appellants, participated in a demonstration in Cincinnati, Ohio and were convicted of violating said law by conducting themselves in an ‘annoying manner.’ Coates appealed to the Ohio Supreme Court, alleging that the ordinance and his conviction violated the First and Fourteenth Amendments of the United States Constitution. Coates argued that the ordinance interfered with the First Amendment protection of the right of the people to peaceably assemble, and that the ordinance as written was so vague that it violated the due process guarantees of the Fourteenth Amendment. Relying on Cameron v. Johnson, a Mississippi anti-picketing case, the Ohio Supreme court found that "annoying" was not unconstitutionally vague and affirmed Coates' conviction.

Opinion of the U.S. Supreme Court 
By a 5–4 vote, the United States Supreme Court struck down the Cincinnati ordinance, finding that it "is unconstitutionally vague because it subjects the exercise of the right of assembly to an unascertainable standard, and unconstitutionally broad because it authorizes the punishment of constitutionally protected conduct." Justice Stewart delivered the opinion of the court, explaining that as the ordinance specified no standard of conduct at all (annoying conduct being based mainly on personal opinion), "men of common intelligence must necessarily guess at its meaning." Given its breadth, the ordinance would give the city the power to punish conduct which would otherwise be constitutionally protected. Additionally, the ordinance violated the constitutionally protected right of free assembly, a core guarantee which could not be abridged merely because someone might be "annoyed." Additionally, such a ordinance would give the state an unlawful power to punish virtually any act.

Black's opinion 
Justice Black wrote a separate opinion, neither concurring nor dissenting with the court's opinion. While he agreed with the majority that the court had jurisdiction to hear the case and that a vague law could constitute a due process violation, Black did not find that the ordinance was facially unconstitutional. Black argued that the ordinance could have both constitutional and unconstitutional applications, and that the factual record from the trial was insufficient to determine which had occurred. Therefore, he argued that the case ought to be sent back to the Ohio Supreme Court to elucidate exactly how the state considered Coates’s actions ‘annoying’. 

Laws creating circumstances where individuals are left unclear about whether their actions are permitted are ultimately too vague to be constitutional. Black backed this claim with relation to a previous case, Lanzetta v. New Jersey, where the state attempted to label unlawful occupation by repeated lawbreakers as a “gangster”. This was declared as unconstitutionally vague as a statement under the Supreme Court.

Black wrote that he would have vacated and remanded the case.

Dissent 
Justice White, along with Justices Burger and Blackmun, dissented, agreeing with Black that the ordinance was not facially unconstitutional. White noted that "as a general rule, when a criminal charge is based on conduct constitutionally subject to proscription and clearly forbidden by a statute, it is no defense that the law would be unconstitutionally vague if applied to other behavior. Such a statute is not vague on its face. It may be vague as applied in some circumstances, but ruling on such a challenge obviously requires knowledge of the conduct with which a defendant is charged" To White, it was not clear what conduct Coates had engaged in, and it might have been conduct within the power of the city to punish. In other words, he believed the ordinance held up under law, but ought to be reviewed on a case-by-case basis.

Similar Cases 
In Cleveland v. Anderson, a 2013 Ohio Court of Appeals case, the Cuyahoga County Court of Appeals ruled that “As it is written, the disorderly assembly ordinance could be used to incriminate nearly any group or individual. With little effort, one can imagine many . . . assemblages which, at various times, might annoy some persons in the city of Cleveland… Neither the police nor a citizen can hope to conduct himself in a lawful manner if an ordinance which is designed to regulate conduct does not lay down ascertainable rules and guidelines to govern its enforcement. This ordinance represents an unconstitutional exercise of the police power of the city of Cleveland, and is therefore void." The Court of Appeals questioned the constitutionality of the law because they believed that it enabled any act to be prosecuted on the streets.

See also 
 Cincinnati v. Discovery Network, Inc.
Cleveland v. Anderson

References

External links
 

1971 in United States case law
United States Supreme Court cases
United States Supreme Court cases of the Burger Court
United States freedom of association case law
Freedom of assembly
Void for vagueness case law
History of Cincinnati
1956 in Ohio